The rail network in Kerala is operated by Indian Railways. The state falls in the Southern Railway zone. The railways connects the most major towns and cities except those in the highland districts of Idukki and Wayanad. 

The total railway network in the state is 1054 kms in length and is controlled by three out of six divisions of the Southern Railway: Thiruvananthapuram railway division headquartered at Thiruvananthapuram, Palakkad railway division headquartered at Palakkad and Madurai railway division. 

Stations on Kanyakumari - Mangalore rail-route (via Kottayam)

Stations on Kayamkulam - Ernakulam Jn. rail-route (via Alappuzha)

Stations on Shoranur - Coimbatore rail-route

Stations on Palakkad Jn.- Tiruchendur rail-route

Stations on Kollam- Sengottai rail-route

Stations on Shoranur - Nilambur Road rail-route

Stations on Thrissur - Guruvayur rail-route

Defunct/Unused railway stations

Gallery

References

Rail transport in Kerala
Lists of railway stations in India